Ricardo Emanuel Rosales Valle (born 6 June 1993) is an Argentine professional footballer who plays as a midfielder for Primera B side Unión San Felipe.

Club career
Rosales played in the youth systems of Boca Juniors, Independiente and Godoy Cruz. In 2015, Rosales moved to Honduras to join Motagua. He departed the club on 27 May. 2016 saw Huracán Las Heras sign Rosales. Six appearances followed in Torneo Federal B. He subsequently spent 2016–17 in Torneo Federal A with Gutiérrez, appearing for his debut in a home loss to Unión Villa Krause on 22 October 2016. Rosales joined Luján de Cuyo in June 2017, with two goals in seventeen following. He then agreed a contract with Torneo Federal C's Fundación Amigos in 2018, where he'd win promotion to Torneo Regional Federal Amateur.

On 2 August 2018, Rosales went to Primera B Metropolitana with All Boys. His first appearance arrived on 24 August versus Fénix, coming off the bench in place of Cristián Sánchez.

International career
Born in Argentina, Rosales is of Chilean descent and holds both passports. In 2013, Rosales trained with the Argentina U20s ahead of the 2013 South American Youth Championship; though didn't make the official squad.

Career statistics
.

References

External links

1993 births
Living people
Sportspeople from Mendoza Province
Argentine people of Chilean descent
Citizens of Chile through descent
Naturalized citizens of Chile
Argentine footballers
Association football midfielders
Argentine expatriate footballers
Expatriate footballers in Honduras
Expatriate footballers in Chile
Argentine expatriate sportspeople in Honduras
Argentine expatriate sportspeople in Chile
Liga Nacional de Fútbol Profesional de Honduras players
Torneo Federal A players
Primera B Metropolitana players
Primera B de Chile players
F.C. Motagua players
Asociación Atlética Luján de Cuyo players
All Boys footballers
Club Atlético San Miguel footballers
Cobreloa footballers
Unión San Felipe footballers